This article lists the winners and nominees for the NAACP Image Award for Outstanding Male Artist. Currently Luther Vandross holds the record for most wins in this category with five.

Winners and nominees
Winners are listed first and highlighted in bold.

1980s

1990s

2000s

2010s

2020s

Multiple wins and nominations

Wins

 7 wins
 Luther Vandross

 3 wins
 Bruno Mars
 Usher

 2 wins
 Babyface
 Chris Brown
 Maxwell
 Pharrell Williams

Nominations

 8 nominations
 Luther Vandross

 7 nominations
 Bruno Mars

 5 nominations
 Chris Brown
 Prince 
 Jay Z
 Kendrick Lamar
 John Legend
 Charlie Wilson

 4 nominations
 Anthony Hamilton
 Common
 Michael Jackson

 3 nominations
 Drake
 Mos Def
 Usher
 Kanye West
 Brian McKnight
 Maxwell

 2 nominations
 Babyface
 Cee Lo Green
 Kem
 Lionel Richie
 MAJOR.
 Ne-Yo
 Seal
 Musiq Soulchild
 Justin Timberlake
 Pharrell Williams
 Stevie Wonder

References

NAACP Image Awards